Kindai University Junior and Senior High School (近畿大学附属高等学校・中学校) is a private non-sectarian and coeducational high school located in Higashiosaka, Osaka, Japan. It has senior and junior high school. It was founded in 1939 under Kinki University.

History 
1939  　Founded as Japan Technical School Pernmitted
1943  　4-year-system Technical School founded
1948  　Renamed Osaka Science and Engineering University High School
1949  　Kindai High School & Kindai Junior High School opened
1978  　Science and Mathematics course started
1987  　International course started
1989  　High school moved to new location
1990  　Coed System started
1993  　Entered Sister School Relationship with Bothell High School(United States)
1994  　Entered Sister School Relationship with Inglemoor High School(United States)
1996  　6-year Educational System introduced
2005  　Entered Sister School Relationship with Mountain Creek State High School

Notable alumni
 Yo Nishino, - a professional basketball player

References

High schools in Osaka Prefecture
Education in Osaka